Apart from the public holidays in New Zealand, usually celebrated by a paid day off work, there are a number of unofficial observances in New Zealand that are celebrated for days, weeks or months.

Days

Chinese New Years in January/February (varies)
World Sleep Day 15 March  
Valentine's Day 14 February 
Loud Shirt Day 24 February (2023, No information available for 2022) 
Children's Day first Sunday in March
International Women's Day 8 March
Walk To Work Day 10 March
St Patrick's Day 17 March
Race Relations Day 22 March
April Fools' Day 1 April
World Book Day 23 April
J Day 3 May
Sleep Apnea Awareness Day 5 May 
Mother's Day second Sunday in May
World No Tobacco Day 31 May
Eid al-Fitr Moon-sighting (varies) 
World Refugee Day 20 June
Shades for Migraine 21 June 
National Disco Day 2 July
International Day of Indigenous People 9 August
World Youth Day 12 August
Cancer Society Daffodil Day last Friday of August
Random Acts of Kindness Day 1 September
Father's Day first Sunday in September
eDay 12 September
International Talk Like a Pirate Day 19 September
Breast Cancer “Pink Ribbon” Day 8 October
World Arthritis Day 12 October
World Stroke Day – 29 October (Coordinated collaboratively by World Stroke Organisation and Stroke Central Region).
Halloween 31 October
Diwali 3 November
NZDA National Oral Health Day on first Friday of November  
Guy Fawkes 5 November
Premature awareness Day 17 November
World day for the Prevention of Abuse and Violence Against Children Day 19 November
“White Ribbon Day” for the Elimination of Violence against Women 25 November
Aids Foundation “Red Ribbon Day” 1 December
Crate Day, first Saturday of December
International Day of Disabled Persons 3 December
World Volunteers Day 5 December
World Human Rights Day 10 December

Weeks
NOTE: Many of these national weeks will change from year to year
Sleep Awareness Week 
Cloth Nappy Week April
Sea Week 27 Feb to 6 March 
New Zealand Sign Language Week from 2 May
Perinatal Mental Health Awareness Week from 1 May
Coeliac Awareness Week from 18 to 24 June
Youth Week from 21 to 29 May
Samoan Language Week 30 May to 5 June
Teach a Kid to Sew Week 3rd week in June
Te Wiki o te Reo Māori (Māori Language Week), typically occurring in the week which includes 14 September.
New Zealand Islam Awareness from 2 August
Mental Health Awareness Week September
New Zealand Conservation Week 10–18 September
National Clean Up Week 17–24 September
New Zealand Fashion Week 21–25 September 
New Zealand Chinese Language Week, typically occurring in the third or fourth week of September
Grandparents Week from 27 October to 1 November 
Get Outdoors Week 16–24 November 
NZ Volunteering Week 19–25 June 2016
NZ Flowers Week
Child Safeguarding Week 4–10 September 2023

Months
Ovarian Cancer Awareness Month 1–28 February;
New Zealand Bike to Work month – February
Endometriosis Awareness Month – March
NZ Music Month – May
Migraine Awareness Month – June
NZ Book Month September from 2006 to 2008, October in 2009,  March from 2011 to 2013 and August in 2014; not held in 2015
Gynaecological Cancer Awareness Month 1–30 September;
Movember Month – November

References

Observances in New Zealand
New Zealand
Lists of observances